Senecio scorzonella, known by the common name Sierra ragwort, is a species of the genus Senecio and family Asteraceae which is native to California and Nevada. It grows in the southernmost Cascade Range, the Sierra Nevada, and the White Mountains.

References

External links

Jepson Manual Treatment
Flora of North America
Photo gallery

scorzonella
Flora of California
Flora of Nevada
Flora of North America
Plants described in 1896
Flora without expected TNC conservation status